Vladimir Viktorovich Ulanov (10 February 1951 – 2000) was a Russian former volleyball player who competed for the Soviet Union in the 1976 Summer Olympics.

In 1976 he was part of the Soviet team which won the silver medal in the Olympic tournament. He played all five matches.

References

External links
 Vladimir Ulanov's profile at Sports Reference.com

1951 births
2000 deaths
Soviet men's volleyball players
Olympic volleyball players of the Soviet Union
Volleyball players at the 1976 Summer Olympics
Olympic silver medalists for the Soviet Union
Olympic medalists in volleyball
Russian men's volleyball players
Medalists at the 1976 Summer Olympics